Bald Knob is a summit in St. Francois County, Missouri, United States.

References

Mountains of St. Francois County, Missouri
Mountains of Missouri